Jeffrey Van Egdom (born 28 August 1987 from Bonheiden) is a Belgian professional darts player.

Career
In 2018, Van Egdom qualified for the 2019 BDO World Darts Championship as the number 23rd seed, he played Scott Waites of England in the first round and lost 3-1.

Van Egdom will make his PDC European Tour debut at the 2020 Belgian Darts Championship after coming through the Host Nation Qualifier. He will face Steve West in the first round.

World Championship results

BDO
 2019: 1st Round (lost to Scott Waites 1-3)

References

External links
 Jeffrey Van Egdom's profile and stats on Darts Database

Living people
Belgian darts players
1987 births
British Darts Organisation players
Professional Darts Corporation associate players
People from Bonheiden
Sportspeople from Antwerp Province